The Nerang Roosters were formed in 1977 and currently field male and female teams in all junior grades of the Gold Coast Rugby League. The club is based at Glennon Park.

Notable juniors
Jaelen Feeney (2016 Newcastle Knights)
Keegan Hipgrave (2017–present Gold Coast Titans & Parramatta Eels)
Kevin Kingston (2005–14 Parramatta Eels, Cronulla Sharks & Penrith Panthers)
Blake Leary (2012–2017 North Queensland Cowboys & Manly Sea Eagles)
Mat Rogers (1995–2001, 2007–2011 Cronulla Sharks & Gold Coast Titans)
Reece Walsh (2021–present New Zealand Warriors & Brisbane Broncos)
Klese Haas (2022-present Gold Coast Titans)

See also

List of rugby league clubs in Australia

References

External links

Rugby league teams on the Gold Coast, Queensland
Rugby clubs established in 1977
1977 establishments in Australia